Parapristipoma is a genus of marine ray-finned fish, sweetlips belonging to the subfamily Plectorhinchinae of the family Haemulidae. The species within the genus are native to the eastern Atlantic Ocean and the western Pacific Ocean.

Species
The currently recognized species in this genus are:
 Parapristipoma humile (S. Bowdich, 1825) (Guinean grunt)
 Parapristipoma macrops (Pellegrin, 1912)
 Parapristipoma octolineatum (Valenciennes, 1833) (African striped grunt)
 Parapristipoma trilineatum (Thunberg, 1793) (chicken grunt)

References

Plectorhinchinae